Markus White (born November 25, 1987) is a former American football defensive end. He was drafted by the Washington Redskins in the seventh round of the 2011 NFL Draft. He played college football at Florida State University. Prior to playing for Florida State, he played one season at Butler Community College where he received the NJCAA national player of the year.

High school career
A native of Lake Worth, Florida, White attended John I. Leonard High School, where he was teammates with Kenrick Ellis.

Regarded as a two-star recruit by Rivals.com, White was not ranked among the best defensive end prospects of his class. He had offers from Akron, Florida Atlantic, Western Michigan, before committing to Rutgers. However, White did not manage to qualify academically, and transferred to Butler Community College.

College career
At Butler Community College, White became a nationally recognized defensive lineman. He set a school record with 24.5 sacks which led the nation, as did his six forced fumbles, and also amassed 97 tackles, of which 39 were behind the line of scrimmage. White was named the NJCAA national player of the year in his lone season at Butler, which went 12-0 and shared the national title after routing No. 1 Snow College.

Now a five-star junior college recruit, White received numerous offers before committing to Florida State. He begin his career with the Seminoles as back-up for Everette Brown, before taking over as starter in 2009.

Professional career

Washington Redskins
White was drafted in seventh round of the 2011 NFL Draft by the Washington Redskins. He was converted from a defensive end to an outside linebacker along with fellow rookie Ryan Kerrigan. He was made the third-string left outside linebacker behind fellow rookie Ryan Kerrigan and Lorenzo Alexander. At the end of the 2011 season, White played a total of two games primarily on special teams.

During the 2012 preseason, White suffered a fractured rib and bruised kidney at practice on August 16. He was released on August 31 for final roster cuts before the start of the 2012 season.

Tampa Bay Buccaneers
On September 3, 2012, White signed with the practice squad of the Tampa Bay Buccaneers.

Washington Redskins (second stint)
On September 18, 2012, White was claimed by the Redskins from the practice squad of the Tampa Bay Buccaneers, after the season-ending injury of fellow linebacker Brian Orakpo. He was released on October 9, 2012, to make room on the roster for Mario Addison.

Tampa Bay Buccaneers (second stint)
White was re-signed to the Buccaneers' practice squad on October 11. He was signed to the active roster two days later. The Buccaneers released him on October 18. Two days later he was signed to the practice squad.

On November 14, White was promoted to the active roster again to replace Quincy Black, who was placed on injured reserve. He was waived on November 17 and signed to the practice squad for a fourth time. On December 22, once again White was promoted to the active roster after Aaron Morgan was placed on injured reserve. On August 26, 2013, he was waived by the Buccaneers.

Saskatchewan Roughriders
White signed a free agent contract with the Riders in May 2014. White re-signed with the Riders on February 16, 2016. He was released by the Roughriders during final cuts in June 2016.

References

External links
Saskatchewan Roughriders bio 
Tampa Bay Buccaneers bio
Washington Redskins bio
Florida State Seminoles bio

1987 births
Living people
American football linebackers
American football defensive ends
Canadian football defensive linemen
African-American players of American football
African-American players of Canadian football
Butler Grizzlies football players
Florida State Seminoles football players
Rutgers Scarlet Knights football players
Washington Redskins players
Tampa Bay Buccaneers players
Saskatchewan Roughriders players
21st-century African-American sportspeople
20th-century African-American people